Jacques Riparelli (born 27 March 1983 in Yaoundé, Cameroon) is a track and field sprint athlete who competes internationally for Italy.

Biography
His father is Italian, mother is Cameroonian. Jacques Riparelli moved with his family to Italy at the age of four.

Riparelli represented Italy at the 2008 Summer Olympics in Beijing. He competed at the 4x100 metres relay together with Fabio Cerutti, Simone Collio and Emanuele di Gregorio. In their qualification heat they were disqualified and eliminated.  He competed in the same event at the 2012 Summer Olympics.

Achievements

See also
 Italian all-time lists - 100 metres
 Italy national relay team

References

External links
 
 
 Jacques Riparelli at FIDAL  
 
 

1983 births
Living people
Italian male sprinters
Olympic athletes of Italy
Athletes (track and field) at the 2008 Summer Olympics
Athletes (track and field) at the 2012 Summer Olympics
Athletes (track and field) at the 2016 Summer Olympics
Sportspeople from Yaoundé
Athletics competitors of Centro Sportivo Aeronautica Militare
World Athletics Championships athletes for Italy
Mediterranean Games gold medalists for Italy
Athletes (track and field) at the 2013 Mediterranean Games
Mediterranean Games medalists in athletics